Elsy Blom-Wirz (7 June 1915 – 6 January 1985) was a Swiss sculptor. Her work was part of the sculpture event in the art competition at the 1948 Summer Olympics.

References

1915 births
1985 deaths
20th-century Swiss sculptors
20th-century Swiss women artists
Swiss women sculptors
Olympic competitors in art competitions
Artists from Basel-Stadt